Russell Sturgis (August 27, 1750 – September 7, 1826) was a noted Boston merchant in the China trade.

Background
Sturgis was the second son of Thomas Sturgis, Jr. (1722-1785), and Sarah Paine, of Barnstable, Massachusetts. He married Elizabeth Perkins (1756-1843), daughter of James Perkins (d. 1773), on November 11, 1773. Her grandfather was the Boston merchant and fur trader Thomas Handasyd Peck, under whom Sturgis apprenticed at age sixteen.  Sturgis then worked as a hatter and furrier. Sturgis served as lieutenant of the Boston regiment of the Massachusetts militia in August and September 1778, and from 1787-1792 served under John Johnston as first lieutenant in Boston.

Sturgis's brothers-in-law, James Perkins (1761-1822) and Thomas Handasyd Perkins (1765-1854), were notable China traders. In 1795 Sturgis joined them in ownership of a new ship, the Grand Turk, which was sent to Canton in March 1796. When the Perkins brothers opened a branch office in Canton in 1803, Sturgis invested substantially, and three of Sturgis's sons—Henry Sturgis (1790-1819), who died in Macao; George Washington Sturgis (1793-1826), who was in Canton between 1810 and 1823; and James Perkins Sturgis (1791-1851), who arrived in 1809 and died on his voyage home—subsequently voyaged to China. In 1818, all three were involved in the opium trade as partners in the firm of James P. Sturgis and Company.

Sturgis was also active in Boston public affairs. From 1790-1796 he was a fire warden; in 1792 he was elected to a committee to assess a smallpox outbreak; and he served as Boston selectman from 1796-1797 and 1799-1802. He represented Boston in the Massachusetts state senate in 1801, and ran unsuccessfully as the Republican candidate for state senator in 1805.

Several portraits of Sturgis survive, including two by Gilbert Stuart, painted circa 1806 and in 1822. These portraits are currently in the Memorial Art Gallery of the University of Rochester, and the Worcester Art Museum, respectively.

See also 
Russell Sturgis (1805-1887), his grandson, head of Baring Brothers, London
John Hubbard Sturgis (1834-1888), his great-grandson, architect

References

1750 births
Businesspeople from Boston
Massachusetts militiamen in the American Revolution
1826 deaths
Sturgis family